Goodbye, France is a World War I era song written and composed by Irving Berlin and published by Waterson, Berlin & Snyder Co.

Reception
Popular recordings of Goodbye, France in 1919 were by The Peerless Quartet and by Nora Bayes.

Lyrics
1st Verse:

Chorus:

2nd Verse:

'Chorus

References

External links
Audio file of Goodbye, France 

1918 songs
Songs written by Irving Berlin
Songs of World War I